0W (zero W) or 0-W may refer to:

0W, zero west, or 0°W, coordinate of the prime meridian
0W or ZW, or zero width, a non-printing character used in computer typesetting of some complex scripts
Zero-width joiner
Zero-width non-joiner
Zero-width space
Zero-width non-breaking space
Zero waste, an environmental concept

See also
W0 (disambiguation)